Alexander Boyd FRSA is a Scottish artist and photographer.

Life and work

Education
Boyd holds an MA (Hons) in History of Art from the University of Glasgow in 2007, where he specialised in 20th Century German Art; and an MSc in Archival and Museum Studies from the Humanities and Advanced Technology and Information Institute (HATII) from the same institution in 2009.

Artwork

Alex Boyd is a Scottish artist best known for his conceptual and figurative landscape photography which explores concepts of Scottish identity through historical and contemporary romanticism, neo-romanticism, Romantic nationalism and Spirit of Place. His work is largely concerned with depictions of the Celtic landscape, conservation and remote places, and is often characterised by its stark, poetic and introspective qualities.

Sonnets

This is perhaps most apparent in his series Sonnets. Based on the Rückenfigur (literally "back figure") paintings of German Romantic painter Caspar David Friedrich and the Besetzungen (occupations) series of images by Anselm Kiefer, Sonnets sought to critique sentimental and kitsch depictions of the Scottish landscape. The series attempts to explore issues of Scottish national identity and its depiction in Scottish art, through depicting controversial historical locations such as Gruinard Island (a site of biological warfare testing) and Glencoe where the Massacre of Glencoe took place.

Sonnets takes its name from a collection of poems by Scottish Makar (Poet Laureate) Edwin Morgan, who later collaborated with Boyd on the project. Sonnets made headlines in 2008 when Boyd had several of his works projected 84 metres high onto Europe's largest building, the Palace of the Parliament in Bucharest, and covered the entire University Square as part of the "White Night in Bucharest" Festival.

In March 2010 Boyd's work was featured in a solo exhibition at the Scottish Parliament Building, where it was celebrated in a Parliamentary motion. American pianist Mike Garson paid tribute to the series in 2011 with a suite of songs directly inspired by Boyd's work, and in 2014 the series was displayed at the Museum of the Image in the Netherlands beside Caspar David Friedrich's iconic painting Wanderer above the Sea of Fog.

Point of the Deliverance / Point a' Tarrthaidh

In 2012 Boyd was made a Fellow of the Ballinglen Arts Foundation, and travelled to Broadhaven Bay in Ireland to begin work on the images which would become Point of the Deliverance. The series documents a special area of conservation and the issues facing it due to the development of the Corrib Gas project, which resulted in the Corrib Gas Controversy. With an antique field camera, Boyd worked intensively for 3 months across the area, using the wet-Plate collodion process to document local people and landscapes, paying special attention to sites of archaeological and historical significance. A labour-intensive process, using wet-plate collodion required Boyd to carry equipment over several miles of moorland, including chemicals, a darktent, and the camera itself often working in harsh conditions. Images from the series were exhibited at the Royal Ulster Academy, and have formed the basis for Mapping the Gàidhealtachd, an ongoing project to document the edges of the Irish Gaeltacht and the Scottish Gàidhealtachd.

The False Land / An t-Saothair 

Boyd was announced as the Royal Scottish Academy's Artist in Residence at Sabhal Mor Ostaig on the Isle of Skye in Scotland for 2012–13, a role which would see his work explore Scottish Gaelic culture and landscape. Working with acclaimed Japanese photographer Takeshi Shikama, Boyd made work focusing on the Cuillin mountain range and the Quiraing, as well as the clearance villages of Skye. The series also took Boyd to the Outer Hebrides, documenting the landscapes of Lewis and Harris as well as the remote archipelago of St Kilda. The resultant large scale prints were displayed prominently at the Royal Scottish Academy as part of their Resident 13 Exhibition in Winter 2013.

The series takes its name from a causeway on the Isle of Skye, utilising a selection of historical processes to depict the landscape and highlight early artistic depictions and distortions of the Scottish landscape. Boyd used a series of antique drawing devices such as a black mirror and a camera lucida to make sketches, as well as drawing from memory.  These drawings were then used as a basis from which to edit and manipulate photographic images also made at each location, exploring ideas of phenomenology, and questioning perception and authenticity in Scottish Art.

The resultant images created distortions of the Highland Landscape, drawing their influence from artists such as William Daniell. A series of out of focus images made using broken camera lenses were also exhibited, and resulted in a collaborative project and book with poet Claire Trevien.

Land of My Desire / Tir mo Rùin
A commission for the Year of Natural Scotland and Cape Farewell, a series of artists were asked to respond to the peatland landscape of the Isle of Lewis, celebrating the role which the blanket bog moorland plays towards global climate regulation. Boyd spent several weeks working on and in the landscape, staying in Shielings at the heart of the moorland while recording archaeological finds, and learning about life on the moor from artist and resident Anne Campbell. The resultant series of work Stacashal was exhibited throughout Scotland in 2013, most notably at the Royal Botanics in Edinburgh, and was made using the photogravure process, a tribute to the work of James Craig Annan one of Boyd's formative influences. Using compass bearings, Boyd shows the moorland from the peak of Stacashal, a remote hill in the centre of the island, a response to the work of Thomas Joshua Cooper who documented the extremities of the island. A second body of work called The Isle of Rust (An t-Eilean Ruadh) was also exhibited, utilising rust from abandoned moorland machinery to produce images of Lewis using the collodion process.

Current work

Currently he is working with a number of Scottish poets on a new series called 'Lowlands', and is the Artist in Residence for North Ayrshire, documenting the landscapes and riverscapes of Ayrshire and the Isle of Arran.

Film and television

In 2011 as part of the Glasgow Film Festival a short film 'Sonnets' about Boyd's work was shown at the GFT. In 2012 Boyd appeared in a BBC series about Victorian photographer Francis Frith alongside presenter John Sergeant, explaining and demonstrating the wet-plate collodion process at Stirling Castle. 
In 2013 Boyd worked alongside notable fashion photographer Rankin discussing the work of early photographic pioneers Hill & Adamson on the ITV programme Britain's Secret Homes. Using the same Edinburgh studio used by Robert Adamson, a calotype portrait of Rankin was created by Boyd and Fionnbharr Ó Súilleabháin during a snowstorm.

Other activities 
In 2009 Boyd participated in Anthony Gormley's One and Other project in a collaboration with National Poet Edwin Morgan, one of a number of collaborations with established poets such as Gerry Cambridge and Claire Trevien. Boyd has also worked with artist and composer Hanna Tuulikki on her project Away With the Birds for the 2014 Commonwealth Games, as well as providing album artwork for BBC Folk singer of the year Bella Hardy.

Boyd has worked as a Museum Curator, and in 2012 was congratulated by the Scottish Parliament for his work in increasing access to heritage and archaeological objects in the South West of Scotland. He was involved in the campaign for Scottish Independence, and was an early member of arts organisation National Collective, being named as one of their Cultural Ambassadors in 2012. His images were included in the publication 'Inspired by Independence' with a body of work titled 'Shadow on the Landscape' examining the role of RNAD Coulport, home of the UK's strategic nuclear deterrent. Boyd is a Fellow of the Winston Churchill Memorial Trust, a member of Accademia Apulia, and a Fellow of the Royal Society of Arts.

Awards
 2010 The Dewar Award   
 2010 Arts Trust for Scotland Award
 2012 Arts Trust for Scotland Award
 2012 Creative Scotland Awards - Best New Talent Award (Artist)  
 2012 Ballinglen Arts Foundation Fellowship
 2012 Fellow of the Winston Churchill Memorial Trust
 2012 Fellow of the Royal Society of Arts

Collections
Boyd's work is held by the following public collections:
National Gallery of Scotland.
Royal Scottish Academy.
 The collections of The University of Glasgow, University of St Andrews, The University of the Highlands & Islands and Sabhal Mòr Ostaig
The Scottish Maritime Museum.

Exhibitions

Solo exhibitions
 2014 The Sky, The Land, The Sea (10 years of Landscape Photography), Kendal Arts Centre   
 2014 Portraits of Experience, The Scottish Maritime Museum 
 2013 The Hebrides, Sabhal Mòr Ostaig, Isle of Skye
 2010 Sonnets from Scotland, The Scottish Parliament, Edinburgh
 2009 North, The Tron Theatre, Glasgow
 2008 Sonnets from Scotland, The Arches, Glasgow, Scotland
 2007 A Man Without A Country, Fulham Palace, London

Group exhibitions

 2014 The Wanderer, Museum of the Image, Breda, Netherlands
 2014 Scottish Scenic Routes, The Lighthouse, Glasgow
 2013 Sea Change/Land of My Desire, The Royal Botanic Gardens, Edinburgh
 2013 Tir Mo Ruin, Inverness Museum & Art Gallery
 2013 Resident 13, Royal Scottish Academy, Edinburgh
 2012 Project 30: New Perspectives From Ireland, Gallery of Photography, Dublin, Ireland
 2011 Accademia Apulia Awards Royal Horseguards, London
 2010 TULCA Arts Festival, Galway Ireland
 2009 Imagine 2009 EU Photography Awards – European Parliament Building, Brussels
 2009 Imagine 2009 EU Photography Awards – Swedish Parliament, Stockholm
 2009 Scottish Photographers – Lillie Gallery, Glasgow
 2007 Retro Future, Fulham Palace, London

Footnotes and references

External links
 Alex Boyd website
 'Sonnets' a short film about Boyd's work by Michael Prince
 BBC Article on 'Point of the Deliverance' by Alex Boyd
 The Morning news - Interview with Alex Boyd
 Landscape Photography Magazine - An extensive interview with Alex Boyd
 Interview with the German Embassy

Landscape photographers
People educated at Irvine Royal Academy
Living people
People from Celle
Scottish people of German descent
Scottish photographers
Alumni of the University of Glasgow
1984 births